The Army Medal is the maximum military award of Spain in peacetime for the army branch.
The regulation for the issue of this medal is modified by the Royal Decree 1040/2003, 1 August (BOD. Núm. 177).

Appearance
On the obverse, surrounded by a silver edge, is a rising sun behind the sea and a matron stands, representing Spain, offering, with the right hand, a laurel wreath and holding a sword with the left. At the top of the oval are the words: "Al mérito distinguido". On the reverse is the emblem of the Army. Each medal has a clasp attached to the ribbon with the legend of the action done in black.

References

Military awards and decorations of Spain

es:Medalla del Ejército, Naval y Aérea